The Battle of Derna at Derna, Cyrenaica, was the decisive victory in April–May 1805 of a mercenary army recruited and led by United States Marines under the command of U.S. Army Lieutenant William Eaton, diplomatic Consul to Tripoli, and U.S. Marine Corps First Lieutenant Presley Neville O'Bannon. The battle involved a forced 521-mile (839-km) march through the North African desert from Alexandria, Egypt, to the eastern port city of Derna, Libya, which was defended by a much larger force.

Background 
In 1804, the former Consul to Tunis, William Eaton (1764–1811), returned to the Mediterranean Sea with the title of Naval Agent to the Barbary States. Eaton had been granted permission from the US government and US President Thomas Jefferson (1743–1826; served 1801–1809) to back the claim of Hamet Karamanli, the rightful heir to the throne of Tripoli who had been deposed by his brother Yusuf Karamanli, who had assassinated his older brother by shooting him in front of his mother.

Hamet was out of the country at the time and decided to remain in exile. Upon his return to the area, Eaton sought out Hamet, who was in exile in Egypt. Upon locating him, Eaton made a proposal to reinstate him on the throne, and Hamet agreed to Eaton's plan.

The three vessels were to provide offshore bombardment support.
 A small detachment of seven US Marines was given to Consul Eaton commanded by First Lieutenant Presley O'Bannon, USMC (1776–1850). Eaton and O'Bannon based their operations at Alexandria, Egypt. With the help of Hamet Karamanli, they recruited about 400 Arab and Greek mercenaries. Eaton became self-appointed general and commander-in-chief of the combined multinational force.

On March 8, 1805, Lieutenant Eaton (as self-designated general and commander in chief) began to lead his forces on a  trek westward across the Libyan North African desert from Egypt. Their objective was the port city of Derna, the capital of the Ottoman province of Cyrenaica (now in eastern Libya). The mercenary forces were promised supplies and money when they reached the city. During the 50-day trek, Eaton became worried over the strained relationship between the Christian Greeks and the roughly 200 to 300 Muslim Arab and Turkish mercenaries. The expedition's supplies were dwindling with Eaton reporting in 1805, "Our only provisions [are] a handful of rice and two biscuits a day." At one point, some of the Arabs in the expedition made a desperate attempt to raid the supply wagon but were beaten back by the Marines and a few Greek artillerymen, who used the expedition's lone cannon. Mutiny threatened the success of the expedition on several occasions. Between March 10 and March 18, several Arab camel drivers mutinied before they had reached the sanctuary of the Massouah Castle. From March 22 to March 30, several Arab mercenaries, under the command of Sheik el Tahib, staged mutinies. By April 8, when he crossed the border into Libya and Tripoli, Eaton had quelled the Arab mutinies. In late April, his army finally reached the port city of Bomba, on the Gulf of Bomba, some miles up the coast from Derna, where US Navy warships ,  and Hornet with Commodore Barron and Captain Hull were waiting for him. Eaton received fresh supplies and the money to pay his mercenaries.

Battle 
On the morning of April 26, Eaton sent a letter to Mustafa Bey, the governor of Derna, to ask for safe passage through the city and additional supplies, but Eaton realized the governor probably would not agree. Mustafa reportedly wrote back, "My head or yours!" On the morning of April 27, Eaton observed a fort in Derna with eight guns. The brig USS Argus sent a cannon ashore to use in the attack. Captain Hull's ships then opened fire and bombarded Derna's batteries for an hour. Meanwhile, Eaton divided his army into two separate attacking parties. Hamet was to lead the Arab mercenaries southwest to cut the road to Tripoli and then attack the city's left flank and storm the weakly defended governor's palace. Eaton with the rest of the mercenaries and the squad of Marines would attack the harbor fortress. Hull and the ships would fire on the heavily-defended port batteries.

The attack began at 2:45 p.m., with Lt. O'Bannon and his Marines leading the advance. O'Bannon led his Marines and 50 Greek gunners with the field piece from the Argus, but the gun's effectiveness was lessened after the firing crew carelessly left the ramrod in the barrel and fired it down range. The harbor defenses had been reinforced, and the attackers were temporarily halted. That, however, had weakened the defenses elsewhere and allowed the Arab mercenaries to ride unopposed into the western section of the city.

Eaton's mercenary army was hesitant under the enemy's musket fire, and he realized that a charge was the only way to regain the initiative. Leading the charge, he was seriously wounded in the wrist by a musketball. On the Argus, Captain Hull saw the Americans and mercenaries were "gaining ground very fast though a heavy fire of Musquetry [sic] was constantly kept upon them." The ships ceased fire to allow the charge to continue. Eaton would report that O'Bannon with his Marines and Greeks "pass'd through a shower of Musketry from the Walls of houses, took possession of the Battery." The defenders fled in haste and left their cannons loaded and ready to fire. O'Bannon raised the American flag over the battery (the unique 15 stars, 15 stripes emblem used from 1795 to 1818, later made famous in the War of 1812 as the "Star-Spangled Banner"), and Eaton turned the captured guns on the city. Hamet's force had seized the governor's palace and secured the western part of the city. Many of the defenders of the harbor fortress fled through the town and ran into Hamet's force. By 4:00 p.m. the entire city had fallen, and for the first time in history, an American flag flew over fortifications on the opposite side of the Atlantic Ocean. According to Tucker, casualties during the fighting for the Americans were two killed and three wounded, and those among the Christian Greek mercenaries were nine killed or wounded. Muslim Turkish or Arab mercenary casualties are unknown, as are those of the defenders.

Yusuf, in Tripoli to the west, was aware of the attack on Derna and had sent reinforcements to the city. By the time the force had arrived, however, the city had fallen. His men dug in and prepared to recapture the city. Eaton fortified his new position, and Hamet took up residence in the governor's palace and assigned the Arab mercenary forces to patrol the outer areas of the city. Yusuf's men dug in south of the city and waited. On May 13, they attacked the city and drove Hamet's Arab forces back and almost recaptured the governor's palace. USS Argus and Eaton's captured batteries pounded the attackers, who finally fled under heavy fire.

Nightfall found both sides back in their original positions. Skirmishes and several other minor attempts were made on the city in the following weeks, but the city remained in American control. From Derna, Eaton now planned to march across the desert and attack Tripoli from the land. During his march, he was informed of the treaty signed on June 10, 1805, between American emissary Tobias Lear from the US State Department and Yusuf Karamanli. In the middle of his trek, Eaton was ordered to return to Egypt with Hamet.

Aftermath 
The Battle of Derna was the first land battle of the United States on foreign soil after the American Revolutionary War (1775–1783). It was the decisive action of the First Barbary War (1801-1805) although Eaton was furious over what he called a "sell-out" between the State Department diplomat Tobias Lear and the bey. Hamet returned to Egypt. The very few US Marines and the Greek mercenaries left Derna without notifying the Arab part of the force. The Arab mercenaries were left in Derna and were never paid for what they had achieved.

William Eaton returned to the United States as a national hero. Legend holds that O'Bannon was presented a Mameluke sword by Hamet, the Ottoman Empire viceroy. No evidence supports that claim. The first mention of Hamet giving O'Bannon a bejeweled sword seems to be in a lengthy article, "Kentucky Officer First to Carry Stars and Stripes to Victory in Foreign Country," by John Presley Cain in the 29 July 1917 edition of the Louisville Courier-Journal. One sword that was purported to be the sword in question has turned out to be a late-Victorian era forgery. He was later awarded a sword of honor by his home state of Virginia. A further legend holds that O'Bannon's exploits in North Africa inspired the Marine Corps officers to adopt Mameluke swords, but that is also uncorroborated by any contemporaneous sources. Swords of the style were very popular in Europe, and a more likely scenario is that the Marines  imitated the influential military leaders who were wearing them.

The attack on Derna was the inspiration for the lyrics of the Marines' Hymn in the line "to the shores of Tripoli." The 1950 American film Tripoli starring John Payne, Maureen O'Hara, Howard da Silva is a fictionalized account of the Battle of Derna.

Legacy 
The , the  that was the US Navy's most decorated destroyer during World War II, was named in honor of U.S. Marine Corps First Lieutenant Presley Neville O'Bannon.

In 1850, the American poet John Greenleaf Whittier wrote the poem "Derne" to commemorate this battle.

References

Bibliography

Further reading 

Lambert, Frank. The Barbary Wars: American Independence in the Atlantic World New York: Hill & Wang, 2005. 
London, Joshua E. Victory in Tripoli: How America's War with the Barbary Pirates Established the U.S. Navy and Shaped a Nation New Jersey: John Wiley & Sons, Inc., 2005. 

Wheelan, Joseph. Jefferson's War: America's First War on Terror 1801-1805. New York: Carroll & Graf, 2003. 
Zacks, Richard. The Pirate Coast: Thomas Jefferson, the First Marines, and the Secret Mission of 1805. New York: Hyperion, 2005. .
Naval Documents related to the United States Wars with the Barbary Powers, Volume V, Part 3 of 3, Naval Operations including diplomatic background from September 7, 1804 through April 1805 by United States Government Printing Office Washington, 1944.

1805 in the Ottoman Empire
Battles involving the United States
Battles of the Barbary Wars
Naval battles of the Barbary Wars
Conflicts in 1805
United States Marine Corps in the 18th and 19th centuries
United States Marine Corps lore and symbols
1805 in Africa
Battles involving Ottoman Tripolitania
April 1805 events
May 1805 events
Derna, Libya